De Wildt is town with a railway station, police station and post office in North West province of South Africa, 40 km west-north-west of Pretoria.

History
It was named after the Dutch engineer Mauritz Edgar de Wildt (1855–1907), who in 1905 surveyed the railway-line between Pretoria and Rustenburg. The town is famous for a speech delivered on 7 December 1912 by General J. B. M. Hertzog which ultimately led to the establishment of the National Party.

Parks and greenspace
Nearby is the Ann van Dyk Cheetah Centre also known as the De Wildt Cheetah and Wildlife Centre. Formed in 1971, the centre breeds cheetah and wild dogs.

References

External links
 Report on General J.B.M. Hertzog's Speech at De Wildt, 7 December 1912 – South African History Online

Populated places in the Madibeng Local Municipality